The 2019–20 Lietuvos krepšinio lyga, also called Betsafe-LKL for sponsorship reasons, was the 27th season of the top-tier level professional basketball league of Lithuania, the Lietuvos krepšinio lyga (LKL). On 13 March 2020, season was ended prematurely because of the coronavirus pandemic.

Coronavirus pandemic
On 13 March 2020, the board of the LKL decided to end the season because of the coronavirus pandemic. Along with this decision, they crowned regular season champions Žalgiris as the new Lithuanian champions.

Competition format
During the regular season, all teams play 32 games. The top eight teams in the regular season standings, after playing their entire 32 game schedule, qualified for the playoffs in the quarterfinals, that was played in a best-of-three games format. The semifinals were played in best-of-three format.

The final round was be played between the two winners of the semifinals. The finals series, for first place, as also games for third place were played in a best-of-five format.

Teams

Location and arenas

At first, nine teams were able to participate because Nevėžis did not provide the required documentation up to 15 August. However, board of the LKL approved participation of that team.

Regular season

League table

Results

Lithuanian clubs in European competitions

References

External links
 LKL website

 
Lietuvos krepšinio lyga seasons
Lithuanian
LKL
2020 in Lithuanian sport
2019 in Lithuanian sport
LKL season